The women's individual épée competition at the 2018 Asian Games in Jakarta took held on 21 August at the Jakarta Convention Center.

Schedule
All times are Western Indonesia Time (UTC+07:00)

Results

Preliminaries

Pool A

Pool B

Pool C

Pool D

Pool E

Summary

Knockout round

Final

Top half

Bottom half

Final standing

References

Results

External links
Fencing at the 2018 Asian Games - Women's individual épée

Women's individual épée